Valerie Piraino is a contemporary artist who works mainly in sculpture, drawing and instillation.

She was born in 1981 in Kigali, Rwanda and raised both in her home country as well as in the United States. Her art reflects her transnational identity and includes themes like defining the many aspects of identity as a whole, anti-colonialism (or anti-imperialism), African diaspora, and ancestral identity and memory. She has been the recipient of over a dozen awards and residencies, and has been featured in over thirty exhibitions in eight states and at least three countries.

Biography 
Valerie's mother, who was a Rwandan designer and seamstress, met her father, an American, while he was working in international relief efforts and development. After spending her early childhood in the Democratic Republic of Congo, and three other countries throughout Africa, Valerie, as well as her parents, moved to Arizona. Later, her family moved to Baltimore, MD, where she studied at the Maryland Institute College of Art. While studying in Baltimore, Valerie traveled back to Rwanda, where much of her mother's side of the family had been killed in the Rwandan Genocide. This trip inspired her work as a transnational artist, including her thesis project.

In 2005, Valerie moved to New York City, where she began her M.F.A. at Columbia University School of the Arts. She graduated with Her M.F.A in 2009 and along with creating her work, she currently works as a part-time faculty member at Parsons School of Design at the New School.

Notable works and exhibitions 
Arguably, her most notorious work is a series of sculptures consisting of papayas created by carving layers of polystyrene, and then covering the shapes in black epoxy clay, paint, resin, sawdust, and occasionally using gold paint to accent the work. The papayas are either displayed on flat surfaces or, as a later development, hung using nets created with twine. When discussing the significance behind the colors, black and gold, Valerie states that the black and gold are reminiscent of the mining and environmental damage that has taken place in Africa due to colonialism. The colors and textures are also said to represent the skin of the people from the region who were exploited for the natural resources of the country. Papayas were the fruit chosen to represent the artists transnational identity and anti-colonial attitude for two main reasons. First, papayas were a common breakfast for the artist when she was a young girl growing up in Africa. Secondly, papayas, native to the Caribbean, represent colonialism because they "follow the trajectory of imperialism and colonialism". Throughout the years and across multiple exhibitions, the meaning behind the work has shifted slightly. In an exhibit that ended in January, 2017 called Dis Place in the Museum of Contemporary African Diasporan Arts, the papayas appeared to be broken and bruised, representing violence against African women.

While the papayas are some of Valerie's most notable works, she has created many other bodies of work and has been in exhibitions across the country, as well as being featured in exhibits in other countries around the world.

Awards and residencies 
Valerie has received many fellowships and awards throughout her years of creating art.

References

External links 

 Valerie Piraino  on Joan Mitchell Center
 Valerie Piraino Artist page on Lower Manhattan Cultural Council
 Artists of the African Diaspora Cast Off the Legacy of Displacement on Hyperallergic
 In Context: Goodman Gallery's 50th Anniversary Exhibit

1981 births
Living people
Resin sculptures
American installation artists
Artists from New York City
Rwandan artists